Dingestow Station was a station on the Coleford, Monmouth, Usk and Pontypool Railway. It was built in 1857 during the construction of the line and was located 3 miles and 32 chains from Monmouth Troy. It was intended to serve the nearby village of Dingestow. It was closed in May 1955 due to a drivers' strike.

Facilities
The station consisted of little more than a station building with a small canopy and single platform. The station master's house was situated at the rear of the station. The station had a signal box from 1896 until June 1931 when it was taken out of use and replaced with two ground frames. There was also a cattle loading dock.

References

Disused railway stations in Monmouthshire
Former Great Western Railway stations
Railway stations in Great Britain opened in 1857
Railway stations in Great Britain closed in 1955
1857 establishments in Wales